Antennablennius variopunctatus, the orange-dotted blenny, is a species of combtooth blenny found in the western Indian Ocean.

References

variopunctatus
Fish described in 1898